Pidilite Industries Limited is an Indian adhesives manufacturing company based in Andheri (East), Mumbai. The company is the dominant and leading adhesives company in India. Pidilite also manufactures products across verticals such as art materials and stationery; food and fabric care; car products, adhesives, and sealants; and speciality industrial products like adhesives, pigments; textile resins, leather chemicals, and construction chemicals.

Pidilite markets the Fevicol range of adhesives. Its other brands are FeviKwik, Dr. Fixit, Roff, Cyclo, Ranipal, Hobby Ideas, M-seal, and Acron. It also markets and manufactures WD-40 in India.

The company has manufacturing facilities across India including in Mahad (Maharashtra), Vapi (Gujarat), Baddi and Kala Amb (both in Himachal Pradesh). In 2022, Pidilite Industries partnered with 100x.VC.

History
The company was founded in 1959. 

References

External links
 Official Website
 Official Website for Industrial Products
 

Manufacturing companies based in Mumbai
Chemical companies of India
Adhesives
Chemical companies established in 1959
1959 establishments in Bombay State
Companies listed on the National Stock Exchange of India
Companies listed on the Bombay Stock Exchange